The repertoire of the Italian-French singer Dalida includes no less than 700 songs that have led her to record in 11 languages.

She signed her first contract with the Barlcay record company on May 2, 1956 and found success with Bambino, which sold 175,000 copies. From 1957 to 1961, she became the biggest record seller in France. Dalida met her first million records sold with the song Le jour où la pluie viendra (Am Tag Als Der Regen Kam for the German version) released in 1958. Twelve years later, she created with her brother her own label called International Show. Her records were initially distributed by Sonopresse (with which she sold nearly 4,600,000 records in the first four years) then by Carrere in 1978. From 1987, many records were released under various additional labels: East-West, PolyGram, Universal. From her death on May 3, 1987 to 2012, Dalida will have certified no less than 2,510,000 sales in France with announced global sales of 8,000,000 for the same period, including 1.2 million made in 1997 alone.

Awarded by labels and competent bodies, Dalida will have received no less than 70 gold, platinum and diamond records for her sales in Germany, France, Canada, Japan, Switzerland and Benelux.

Due to an international career led, she ranked in many hit parades around the world appearing in the rankings in Belgium 112 times (Flanders and Wallonia), 104 times in France, 62 times in Canada, 17 times in Italy, 16 times in Switzerland, 12 times in Turkey, 9 times in Spain, 7 times in Argentina, 5 times in the Netherlands, 4 times in Germany, 3 times in Poland, 2 times in Japan, Brazil, Israel, and once in Austria, Mexico and Portugal. In the United States, she also appeared twice jointly with other artists in the Cash Box top 100 (Best Selling Tunes on Records list) between 1958 and 1959. To this can be added sales in certain countries which did not then have sales rankings such as Lebanon, Russia, Eastern European countries (especially Czechoslovakia) and African countries, where the singer has cumulatively sold several million records.

Albums

Studio albums

Live albums

Compilation albums

Soundtrack albums

Box sets

Extended plays

Singles

Mainstream

Promotional

Charts

Songs

1950s

1960s

1970s

1980s

Since 1987

Albums

1960–1987

Since 1987

References

External links 
Chart sources, per country column:

"Argentina, Austria, Spain and Turkey. Partially France, Italy, Japan and Belgium"
Argentina; "Cuore matto", "Ciao amore, ciao"
"Belgium and Switzerland"
France; Orlando, CIDD, France-Inter, Europe 1, RMC, RTL, "La bourse des chansons", "Music Hall", "Dans le bleu du ciel bleu", "Si j'avais des millions"
"Germany"
"Israel"
"Italy - 1", "Italy - 2", "Mamy blue", "Milord"
"Japan"
"Luxembourg"
"Monte Carlo"
"Netherlands"
"Québec"

Bibliography 
 L'argus Dalida: Discographie mondiale et cotations, by Daniel Lesueur, Éditions Alternatives, 2004. .

Dalida
Discographies of French artists
Discographies of Italian artists
Discographies of Egyptian artists
Pop music discographies